The 2023 Qatar Total Open, also known as Qatar TotalEnergies Open, was a professional women's tennis tournament played on outdoor hard courts. It was the 21st edition of the event as a WTA 500 tournament on the 2023 WTA Tour. It took place at the International Tennis and Squash complex in Doha, Qatar, during 13–18 February 2023.

Finals

Singles

  Iga Świątek def.  Jessica Pegula, 6–3, 6–0

Doubles

  Coco Gauff /  Jessica Pegula def.  Lyudmyla Kichenok /  Jeļena Ostapenko, 6–4, 2–6, [10–7]

Points and prize money

Point distribution

Prize money

*per team

Singles main-draw entrants

Seeds

1 Rankings are as of February 6, 2023

Other entrants
The following players received a wildcard into the singles main draw:
  Victoria Azarenka
  Sofia Kenin
  Maria Sakkari
  İpek Öz

The following player received entry using a protected ranking into the singles main draw:
  Karolína Muchová

The following player received a special exempt into the main draw:
  Zheng Qinwen

The following players received entry from the qualifying draw:
  Rebecca Marino 
  Elise Mertens 
  Karolína Plíšková 
  Viktoriya Tomova

Withdrawals 
 Before the tournament
  Ons Jabeur → replaced by  Barbora Krejčíková
  Anett Kontaveit → replaced by  Karolína Muchová
  Aryna Sabalenka → replaced by  Zhang Shuai
 During the tournament
  Belinda Bencic (fatigue)

Doubles main-draw entrants

Seeds 

 Rankings are as of February 6, 2023

Other entrants
The following pairs received wildcards into the doubles main draw:
  Mubaraka Al-Naimi /  Ekaterina Yashina
  Chan Hao-ching /  Latisha Chan

The following pair received entry as alternates:
  Ekaterina Alexandrova /  Aliaksandra Sasnovich

Withdrawals 
  Victoria Azarenka /  Elise Mertens → replaced by  Ekaterina Alexandrova /  Aliaksandra Sasnovich

References

External links
 

Qatar Total Open
Qatar Ladies Open
2023 in Qatari sport
Qatar Total Open